Duncan & Fraser Limited was a vehicle manufacturing company founded in 1865 in Adelaide, South Australia that built horse-drawn carriages and horse trams, and subsequently bodies for trains, electric trams and motor cars, becoming one of the largest carriage building companies in Australia.

In 1919 the company decided to abandon coachbuilding and confine itself to automotive manufacture; by 1927 the construction of Ford Model T motor car bodies had become the company's principal activity and the company was operating automotive distributorships and dealerships. However, the succeeding Ford Model A required an all-steel body, which Ford's US headquarters decided would be made in Canada and assembled in Ford's own factory in Geelong. Since most of the company's income had consequently ceased, the shareholders voted in August 1927 to close the company.

Horse-drawn carriages

In January 1865, coach builder James Duncan and coach painter James Fraser – Scottish immigrants to Adelaide, South Australia – formed a private company, Duncan and Fraser Limited. They operated initially out of a workshop at 37 Franklin Street, Adelaide, with six tradesment employees, but as they expanded the range of their products their business outgrew the premises and in January 1870 they moved to a newly constructed building with a 100-foot (30 metre) frontage at number 42 on the opposite (north) side of Franklin Street.

At the first Intercolonial Exhibition, held in Sydney in 1869, Duncan & Fraser competed against some of the oldest companies in the Commonwealth, and secured the first prize. The impetus saw their turnover double in one year.

Railway carriages

In 1873 Duncan & Fraser were commissioned to build two railway carriages for the Adelaide, Glenelg & Suburban Railway Company.

Trams

In 1876 and 1877 the company assembled Adelaide's first 20 horse-drawn trams imported by the Adelaide & Suburban Tramway Company from John Stephenson & Co, New York, United States. During the next quarter century the firm became one of the largest carriage building companies in Australia, building in addition to horse-drawn carriages, many hundreds of horse trams for companies in South Australia and Victoria.

In 1884, 16 acres of land was secured adjacent to the Port Adelaide railway line at Kilkenny. After Fraser died in August 1886, Duncan bought out his share from his widow. However, the trading name remained unchanged.

Duncan & Fraser diversified into the construction of tram bodies, becoming one of the largest carriage building companies in Australia. The company completed 120 A, B, C and D types for the Adelaide network as well as A, C, D, E, F, G, H, M, N, O, P, S, T, U and V class trams for the Melbourne network. It also built trams for the State Electricity Commission of Victoria's Ballarat, Bendigo and Geelong systems.

In 1913 the business was incorporated into a limited liability company in keeping with its increasing scope.

In 1919 the company decided to abandon coachbuilding and confine itself to automotive manufacture.

Cars

Bodies 
In 1900 Duncan & Fraser completed its first automobile body for Lewis Cycle Works.

Dealerships
In May 1903 Duncan & Fraser secured the Oldsmobile automobile agency. A showroom, complete with a salesman, spare parts, accessories, clothing and driving instruction was established, a first for South Australia. In 1906, the existing factory was replaced by a new two storey factory. After Duncan died on 2 July 1908, the business was taken over by his four sons, James, Robert, Archie and Richard. Duncan & Fraser secured more automobile agencies, including the Orient Buckboard, Argyll, Standard, Singer, Chalmers and BSA.

Ford

In August 1909, it secured the sole distributorship for the Ford Model T for South Australia and Broken Hill.

Ford Canada was unhappy about most of the Australian Ford distributors selling other makes. Thus Duncan & Fraser annexed the Ford agency. In October 1920 Duncan Motors was formed to sell and service all Ford products with Duncan & Fraser selling all other makes. In the early 1920s Duncan & Fraser secured the Studebaker car agency. The Kilkenny site was sold to Holden Motor Bodies and a new factory specially designed to manufacture cars built in Mile End. Rectangular in shape, it allowed for an assembly line type process, similar to the system implemented in 1913 by Henry Ford in Detroit to manufacture the Ford Model T.

On 21 February 1923, the Franklin Street factory was destroyed by fire. Temporary buildings and workshops were rented in various parts of Adelaide. A new three storey factory opened on the Frankilin Street site in August 1924. In March 1925 the Ford Australia was established in Geelong, with bodies initially built by Duncan & Fraser and supplied through Duncan Motors. By May 1926 body panels were being imported by Ford Australia directly from Ford Canada and assembled in Geelong.

In August 1927, Ford Canada announced that production of the Ford Model T would cease. Ford Australia followed suit a week later. All the Ford agents including Duncan Motors were informed that they would not have any Ford cars to sell for an estimated 12 months whilst the factories in retooled for the new Model A.

Voluntary liquidation
Faced with no Ford bodies to build and no Fords to sell and because Duncan & Fraser's other car agencies were unprofitable the directors decided to recommend to the shareholders that the business be wound up in August 1927.

Duncan & Fraser's premises were taken over by competitor TJ Richards & Sons during the Great Depression of the 1930s.

References

Gallery

Car manufacturers of Australia
Electric vehicle manufacturers of Australia
Ford Australia
Manufacturing companies based in Adelaide
Defunct rolling stock manufacturers of Australia
Tram manufacturers
Vehicle manufacturing companies established in 1865
1865 establishments in Australia
1927 disestablishments in Australia